Metal Aircraft Corporation was an American aircraft manufacturer of transport aircraft. The company was a pioneer in all-metal construction at a time when the technology was in its infancy.

History 

In October 1927, Thomas E. Halpin, the former chief inspector of the Stout Metal Airplane Company, moved to Cincinnati and founded the Halpin Development Corporation to begin work on a new airplane design. He was joined by Ralph R. Graichen, the co-designer of the Ford Trimotor, who became vice-president and chief engineer of the company. By January 1928, construction of the Halpin Flamingo had started. Following the first flight of the airplane at Lunken Airport on 9 April 1928, the company was offered $10,000 if it would remain in Cincinnati. Within two weeks the company was purchased by a group of Cincinnatians and on 2 May 1928 it was reincorporated as the Metal Aircraft Corporation. Production of the Metal Aircraft Flamingo transport was continued at its factory at the Lunken Airport with several variations.

In September 1928, construction on a new factory was started at Lunken Airport. Later, by July 1929, Mason-Dixon Air Lines installed a ticket counter and waiting room in the building.

Following a merger with the Johnson Airplane and Supply Company of Dayton, Ohio and the Kansas City Airport in September 1929, Robert H. Shryver, president of Columbus Flying Service, purchased a controlling interest in the company.

By 1932, the former Metal Aircraft Corporation factory was being used by the Vermilya-Huffman Flying Service and the Jones-Graichen Aircraft Corporation.

Aircraft

See also
 Aeronca Aircraft
 International Aircraft

References

Footnotes

Notes

Bibliography

External links

 The Flamingo Takes Flight: Cincinnati’s First All-Metal Airplane, Pt. 1 – Cincinnati Museum Center
 The Flamingo Takes Flight: Cincinnati’s First All-Metal Airplane, Pt. 2 – Cincinnati Museum Center

Aviation in Ohio
Defunct aircraft manufacturers of the United States
Defunct companies based in Cincinnati